Circuito de Albacete is a motorsports facility located in Albacete, Spain, opened in 1990.

Events

Annual racing events at the facility included the Endurance World Championship and the FIA European Truck Racing Championship.

The facility also used to host a Superbike World Championship round from  until .

Lap records 

The official race lap records at the Circuito de Albacete are listed as:

References

External links 

  

Motorsport venues in Castilla–La Mancha
Superbike World Championship circuits
Sports venues in Castilla–La Mancha
Buildings and structures in Albacete
Sport in Albacete